The replete dart (Feltia repleta) is a moth of the family Noctuidae. It is a tropical species found from Argentina and Brazil to Mexico and occurs occasionally in Florida, Louisiana and southern Texas.

The wingspan is 45–50 mm.

The larvae feed on a wide variety of plants, including various agricultural crops such as tomatoes.

External links
Bug Guide
Image
Species info

Noctuinae
Moths of North America
Moths of South America